Leonida Christos Bertos (born 20 December 1981) is a New Zealand professional footballer who last played as a midfielder for Hamilton Olympic in the National Premier Leagues. Leo Bertos is currently the head coach of Northern NSW NPL side Weston Bears FC

A New Zealand international from 2003 to 2013, he represented his country at the 2010 FIFA World Cup.

Early life
Bertos was born in Wellington, to a Greek father and a New Zealand Māori mother. He attended Holy Cross primary school (1987–1994) and Wellington College (1995–1999) where he played for the school's first XI.

Bertos played for Wellington Olympic in the New Zealand domestic league between 1997 and 2000.

Club career

Barnsley
Bertos started his career in England, playing in Barnsley's youth system. He made his debut for the Barnsley reserve team against Rotherham United in October 2000 and his first-team debut for Barnsley in a 0–4 defeat to Preston North End on 16 April 2001. Bertos signed a professional contract for the club a day later. He picked up a knee injury whilst playing in Tenerife, the results of which required a second opinion. These results were delayed, but, when received, it was confirmed that no meniscus was present to his tendon. He scored once for Barnsley; in a 4–1 defeat to Bristol City.

Rochdale
He had a reasonably successful two-year spell at Rochdale scoring the goal in a 1–0 win at Kidderminster that secured the team's League status in 2003–04, but fell out of favour the following year and was released.

Chester City
After failing to impress in a short spell at Chester City Bertos played non-league football for Barrow, York City, Scarborough and Worksop Town.

Perth Glory
Bertos signed for A-League franchise Perth Glory for the start of the 2006–07 season on a two-year contract. Bertos' signing was an attempt to add depth to a Perth midfield that lacked consistency and strength in 2005–06. Bertos replaced star midfield player Nick Ward. Starting all 21 matches of the regular season, Bertos' pace, ability to beat his man, and dangerous crosses from wide areas, resulted in nine assists in his debut season, making him the highest assisting player in the league. Fans bemoaned the fact he failed to find the back of the net given the number of good scoring opportunities.

Bertos explored new opportunities during the A-League off-season. Glory manager Ron Smith allowed him to trial with Greek club Skoda Xanthi, however the trial was unsuccessful and Bertos returned to Perth in time for the start of the 2007–08 season.

During the 2007–08 season Bertos made fourteen appearances for the club and scored one goal and had two assists.

Wellington Phoenix

On 24 January 2008, Bertos was signed on a free transfer by his hometown club Wellington Phoenix on a two-year contract. He made his club debut in the opening game of the 2008–09 season against Brisbane Roar. Bertos scored his first goal for Wellington against Sydney on 7 November 2008. He played in 16 of the 21 regular season matches making 14 starts with 2 goals and 4 assists. Bertos was named Wellington Phoenix Player of the Year for 2008–09.

The 2009–10 season was incredibly successful for Bertos and the Phoenix. Bertos played a central role during the regular season to ensure a first finals appearance for the club. He played every game of the season, starting 23 of the 28 matches, scoring 2 goals and providing 8 assists. He holds the all-time leading assists record for the club with 12. On 1 October 2009 he signed a three-year contract extension. On 13 April 2014, the Phoenix announced he would be leaving the club.

East Bengal
On 19 July 2014, he signed for Indian club East Bengal FC for a two-year contract. On the virtue of playing in 2010 FIFA World Cup, he qualifies as the marquee player of the club. He was issued the number 11 jersey. He made his debut in a CFL match against Techno Aryan on 23 August 2014, coming as a substitute for Mehtab Hussain.

NorthEast United
As the Indian Super League started, Bertos joined the competition by going on loan to NorthEast United. There he reunited with his former coach at national team Ricki Herbert.

Hamilton Olympic
Bertos signed for Australian National Premier Leagues side Hamilton Olympic for the 2016 season after training for several weeks with Newcastle Jets.

International career
Bertos made his international debut against Iran on 13 October 2003 and has represented New Zealand over 50 times since. He has also represented New Zealand at under-23 level.

Bertos is known for his dribbling and quality skills on the ball. This was shown in the New Zealand vs Brazil game in which he dribbled around two defenders to win a corner. He also played many one-twos and did a drag-back once in the second half. In the first game of the New Zealand vs Malaysia series (which New Zealand won 1–0), Bertos received the Man of the Match award for his magnificent dribbling performance and domination of the Malaysian defence.

He represented New Zealand at the 2009 FIFA Confederations Cup in South Africa. He provided the assist for New Zealand's first two goals against World Champions Italy in a 3–4 friendly loss in Pretoria prior to the Confederations Cup.

2010 FIFA World Cup
In Wellington on 14 November 2009, Bertos provided the assist and delivered the corner from which Rory Fallon headed a thumping game winner against Bahrain to give New Zealand the two-legged aggregate win needed to secure a spot at the 2010 FIFA World Cup.

Bertos was on hand to see the World Cup trophy unveiled on New Zealand soil for the first time, when it made an eight-hour stop-over in Auckland on 27 April 2010 on its worldwide tour before the 2010 World Cup in South Africa.

On 10 May 2010 Bertos was named as one of eight midfielders in the final 23-man squad to travel to the 2010 FIFA World Cup in June. The squad played several official warm-up internationals against Australia, Serbia, Slovenia and Chile before the World Cup.

Bertos played in all three games at the World Cup, putting in gritty performances to earn New Zealand a 1–1 draw with Slovakia, a 1–1 draw with reigning world champions Italy, and their final 0–0 draw with Paraguay.

Futsal
Bertos was named in the New Zealand Futsal squad to play Australia in a three match series in July 2014 scoring a goal in his debut for the side

Management career
Bertos was named the coach of Weston Bears in January 2020 after former manager Kew Jaliens flagged an intention to return to Europe.

Career statistics

Club

International

Honours
Individual
Wellington Phoenix Player of the Year: 2008–09

References

External links

Living people
1981 births
A-League Men players
Barnsley F.C. players
Chester City F.C. players
National League (English football) players
Expatriate footballers in England
Expatriate soccer players in Australia
Expatriate footballers in India
Association football wingers
People educated at Wellington College (New Zealand)
New Zealand expatriate association footballers
New Zealand expatriate sportspeople in Australia
New Zealand expatriate sportspeople in England
New Zealand international footballers
New Zealand association footballers
New Zealand people of Greek descent
New Zealand Māori sportspeople
Association footballers from Wellington City
Perth Glory FC players
Rochdale A.F.C. players
Scarborough F.C. players
English Football League players
Wellington Phoenix FC players
Worksop Town F.C. players
York City F.C. players
Barrow A.F.C. players
East Bengal Club players
NorthEast United FC players
I-League players
Indian Super League players
New Zealand men's futsal players
Wellington Olympic AFC players
2004 OFC Nations Cup players
2008 OFC Nations Cup players
2009 FIFA Confederations Cup players
2010 FIFA World Cup players
2012 OFC Nations Cup players